Walter Douglas Chapman (1889-1975) was an Australian rules footballer who played with Richmond and Melbourne in the Victorian Football League (VFL).

Born in Dromana to Henry George Chapman and Isobella Gibson, Doug Chapman joined Richmond from Dromana at the start of the 1908 VFL season. In 1910, he transferred to Essendon Association Football Club in the Victorian Football Association (VFA), and he was a member of their premiership winning team in 1912. He returned to the VFL when he joined Melbourne, where he made ten senior appearances during the 1913 VFL season. In 1914, he joined Hawthorn in their first year of senior football in the VFA, and he played until 1919, making 29 appearances in total for the club.

In 1917, he married Eveline Vere Innes, and they lived in the eastern suburbs of Melbourne until his death in 1975.

Notes

External links 

1889 births
1975 deaths
Australian rules footballers from Melbourne
Australian Rules footballers: place kick exponents
Richmond Football Club players
Melbourne Football Club players
Essendon Association Football Club players
Hawthorn Football Club (VFA) players
People from Dromana, Victoria